In the Belgian Bowl XVI, the Antwerp Diamonds were disqualified giving the title to the Brussels Black Angels.

2003 standings

References

External links
Official Belgian Bowl website

American football in Belgium
Belgian Bowl
Belgian Bowl